Carborundum Universal Ltd (CUMI), a part of Murugappa Group, is one of the largest and oldest conglomerates in India. CUMI is the leading manufacturer and developer of abrasives, ceramics, refractories, aluminium oxide grains, machine tools, polymers, adhesives and electro minerals in India.

The company has subsidiaries in India, Russia, South Africa, Australia, China, Thailand and Canada.

History

CUMI was established as a result of diversification from banking business through cycle manufacturing with the intent to manufacture abrasive materials. CUMI's parent company, the Murugappa Group, made a tie up with the Carborundum, UK, a subsidiary of American abrasive manufacturer, Carborundum, USA and the Universal Grinding Co. Ltd., UK in 1950. The result was the Carborundum Universal of Madras. Then it was renamed and incorporated in 1954 as Carborundum Universal Ltd (CUMI).

Establishments
Initially CUMI was founded to manufacture the core products for the collaborating companies. Later the company established its first bonded abrasive plant at Chennai with the facility acquired from Ajax Products and began its manufacturing in the abrasives platform. With the intention of producing technical ceramics for high temperature insulation products CUMI has made joint venture with Morgan Crucible Plc. UK resulted in the establishment of Murugappa Morgan Thermal Ceramics Ltd in 1982.

The company has laid a strong foundation in Engineered Ceramics through number of joint ventures. In 1991 Wendt (India) Ltd, a joint ventured company of Wendt GmbH, Germany and The House of Khataus, was merged with the CUMI. CUMI's first Industrial Ceramics division was established in Hosur, Tamil Nadu as a technical partnership with Coors Ceramics, USA in 1991. Later it was expanded with the unique Metallized Cylinders Plant.

As a part of expanding their presence, in 2005 the company started CUMI Middle East FZE in Ras Al Khaimah. In order to strengthen their global presence CUMI bought Abrasive Enterprises Inc., Canada, for $2.24 Million by 2006. After a year CUMI established CUMI International Ltd in Cyprus.

Acquisitions
With in a decade, after the withdrawal of the collaborators, CUMI acquired Ajax Products Pvt Ltd. CUMI stepped up in abrasive industries by acquiring the Eastern Abrasives Ltd, Kolkata in 1978. In 1997 Cutfast Abrasive Tools Ltd, Eastern Abrasive Ltd, Cutfast Polymers Ltd and Carborundum Universal Investment are joined with Carborundum Universal Ltd. 
With in a year of acquisition of Sterling Abrasives Ltd and SEDCO in 2003, CUMI acquired CUMI Australia Pty Ltd., Australia. In 2007 the company took over a china based firm Sanhe Yanjiao Jingri Diamond Industrial Company Ltd and Russian Volzhsky Abrasive Works. The further acquisitions are followed in 2008, Foskor Zirconia Ltd, South Africa became a subsidiary of CUMI

Diversification
Besides manufacturing, marketing and distribution CUMI also involved in a diversified works like mining, power generation and TOT agreements with various organizations.
CUMI acquired Bauxite mines at Bhatia and Okha of Gujarat in India, Silicon Carbide plant in Koratty, Kerala and a Brown Aluminium Oxide grains Plant at Edapally, Kerala, India. CUMI established a 12MW Hydroelectric power plant at Maniyar, Kerala in 1994 and a 5.5MW Wind mill at Nallur.

CUMI made a technology transfer with Answer Technology Inc., USA for advanced monolithics and a technical collaboration with National Institute for Interdisciplinary Science and Technology of India, Bhabha Atomic Research Centre of India and Pennsylvania State University of USA for the development of advanced ceramic technology.

CUMI Direct

CUMI Direct was started in the year of 2005. CUMI direct is selling 
 Ware house Equipment - Pallet Truck, Stacker, Table Lifts, Movable Dock Ramps, Stationary Dock Leveler, Tail Lifts, Fork Lifts, Plastic Pallets, Caster Wheels.
 Material Handling Equipment - Shopping Trolley, Hand Cart
 Power-tools - CUMI power tools, METABO Power Tools
 Industrial Ceramics - CUMI Industrial Ceramics Products
 Electro Minerals - CUMI Electro Mineral Products
 Abrasives - CUMI Abrasive products - Thin Wheels, Rolls, Grinding Wheels, Non Woven Wheels, Coated Abrasives, Porous Tiles, Super Abrasives, Resonoid And Rubber, Vitrified Ranges
 Metal Working Fluids - Cleaner, Forming fluids, Neat Oils, Rust Preventives, Water Solubles.
 Strapping Tools - Tensioner, Sealer.
 Super Refractories products - Fired Refractories, Monolithic Products
Most of the products are granted CE and GS certificates.

Major divisions

The major divisions are:
 Abrasives
 Coated Abrasives
 Bonded Abrasives
 Electrominerals
 Ceramics
 Industrial Ceramics
 Super Refractories
 CUMI DIRECT direct -  Online E commerce Platform
 Ware house Equipment
 Material Handling Equipment
 Power-tools
 Industrial Ceramics
 Electro Minerals
 Abrasives
 Metal Working Fluids
 Strapping Tools
 Super Refractories products

Product applications and materials

The range of applications of different divisions like material removal, polishing the rough surface, fine finishing by the Abrasives division, wear resistant, heat resistant, liners and metallized ceramics by the Ceramics division, heat resistant, containment products from Super refractories division and the raw materials for abrasives and refractories by the Electrominerals division.

Abrasives
 Coated Abrasives
 Bonded Abrasives
 Processed Cloth
 Polymer Resin
 Metal Working Fluids
Ceramics
 High Alumina
 Reaction bonded Silicon Carbide(RbSiC)
 Yttria partially stabilized Zirconia(YPSZ)
 Sintered Silicon Carbide
 Zirconia
 Al-Titanate
 MgO-Partially stabilized Zirconia(MgPSZ)
Electrominerals
 Brown Fused Aluminum Oxide
 White Fused Aluminum Oxide
 Calcia Stabilized Zirconia
 Ziconia Mullite
 Alumina Bubble
 Silicon Carbide
 Calcined Bauxite
Agri Input products
 CUMIjal

Joint ventures
 Wendt (India) Limited 
 Murugappa Morgan Thermal Ceramics Ltd.
 Ciria India Limited

Subsidiaries
 CUMI Abrasives and Ceramics China Limited (CACCL) 
 CUMI America Inc.
 CUMI Australia Pty. Ltd. (CAPL)
 CUMI Canada Inc.
 CUMI International Limited, Cyprus
 CUMI Middle East-RAK
 Cellaris Refractories India Limite
 Foskor Zirconia Pty Ltd-South Africa 
 Net Access India Limited
 Southern Energy Development Corporation Limited (SEDCO) 
 Sterling Abrasives Limited-Ahmedabad
 Pluss Advanced Technologies
 Volzhsky Abrasive Works-Russia

See also
 Murugappa Group

References

External links
Cumiabrasives.com– CUMI Abrasives Division
Cumiceramics.com – CUMI Industrial Ceramics Division
Cumirefractories.com – CUMI Super Refractories Division
Cumiemd.com – CUMI Electro Minerals Division

Manufacturing companies of India
Companies based in Chennai
Murugappa Group
1954 establishments in Madras State
Indian companies established in 1954
Manufacturing companies established in 1954